Chaetosifemur is a genus of flies belonging to the family Lesser Dung flies.

Species
C. longiventre Papp, 2008

References

Sphaeroceridae
Diptera of Asia
Brachycera genera